This is a list of the municipalities in the state of Rondônia (RO), located in the North Region of Brazil. Rondônia is divided into 52 municipalities, which are grouped into 6 immediate regions, which are grouped into 2 intermediate regions. Of the 52 municipalities, the largest by population is its capital, Porto Velho, while the smallest is Pimenteiras do Oeste which only has 2,191 inhabitants.

See also
Geography of Brazil

References 

Rondonia